This was the first edition of the tournament.

Hernán Casanova and Santiago Rodríguez Taverna won the title after defeating Facundo Juárez and Ignacio Monzón 6–4, 6–3 in the final.

Seeds

Draw

References

External links
 Main draw

Challenger de Villa María - Doubles